Celia Foulon (born 14 April 1979) is a French rower. She won a gold medal at the 2004 World Rowing Championships on the Lake of Banyoles in Catalonia, Spain, in the women's four event.

References

External links

Living people
1979 births
French female rowers
World Rowing Championships medalists for France
21st-century French women